Bronislaw Bernacki (born September 30, 1944, Murafa, Vinnytsia oblast, Ukraine) was the Roman Catholic Bishop of Odessa-Simferopol diocese from 2002 to 2020.

Biography

He studied at the Catholic Seminary of Riga. Bernacki was ordained to the priesthood on May 28, 1972 in Riga. After ordination he served as a parish priest in the town of Bar and neighboring parishes. In 1995 - prior to his native village, and the Vicar General of the Diocese of Kamiamets-Podilskyi. On May 4, 2002 the Holy See announced the creation of Odesa-Simferopol diocese, which included the Crimea, Odesa, Mykolayiv, Kirovohrad and Kherson regions of Ukraine. Bronislaw Bernacki was appointed bishop of the newly formed diocese.

On July 4, 2002 in Kamiamets-Podilskyi was elevated to bishop. The construction of the chair was held on July 13, 2002. His episcopal motto chose the words "Through Mary to Jesus". Bishop Bernacki's chair is located in Odesa. Bishop Bernacki took part in the Catholic Bishops' Conference of Ukraine, holding the presidency of the Commission on the Laity, also being the initiator of the establishment and the head of the Spiritual Board of confessional Christian denominations in Odesa and Odesa Region.

Pope Francis accepted his resignation as bishop on 18 February 2020.

References

External links

 http://www.dompavlov.com/church/bernacki.htm
 http://www.catholic-hierarchy.org/bishop/bbernb.html 
 http://www.gcatholic.org/dioceses/diocese/odes0.htm
 https://web.archive.org/web/20110807010533/http://www.catholic.od.ua/bernacki1.html

Ukrainian Roman Catholic bishops
Ukrainian people of Polish descent